The 1993 Barber Saab Pro Series season was the ninth season of the series. Zerex continued to support the racing series. All drivers used Saab powered Goodyear shod Mondiale chassis. Swede Kenny Bräck won the championship. Bräck raced in the International Formula 3000 the following season.

Race calendar and results

Final standings

References

Barber Dodge Pro Series
1993 in American motorsport